Einar Gundersen (born 7 September 1948) is a Norwegian wrestler. He competed in two events at the 1976 Summer Olympics.

References

External links
 

1948 births
Living people
Norwegian male sport wrestlers
Olympic wrestlers of Norway
Wrestlers at the 1976 Summer Olympics
People from Notodden
Sportspeople from Vestfold og Telemark